Amoria may refer to:

Biology
 Amoria (gastropod), a taxonomic genus of medium-sized predatory marine gastropod 
 A synonym of the genus Trifolium (clovers)

Other
 Amoria Neal-Tysor, basketball player on the 2021–22 Mercer Bears women's basketball team
 Oil Tanker Amoria, of the Iraqi Oil Tankers Company
 A schooner shipwrecked in Lake Pasteur, Quebec, Canada, in 1922
 A location in Dungeons & Dragons; see